The Forty Thieves is a "Pantomime Burlesque" written by Robert Reece, W. S. Gilbert, F. C. Burnand and Henry J. Byron, created in 1878 as a charity benefit, produced by the Beefsteak Club of London. The Beefsteak Club still meets in Irving Street, London. It was founded by actor John Lawrence Toole and others in 1876, in rooms above the Folly Theatre, King William IV Street.  It became an essential after theatre club for the bohemian theatre set, such as Henry Irving, Toole, John Hare, W. H. Kendal, F. C. Burnand, Henry Labouchère, W. S. Gilbert and two hundred of their peers.  It soon moved to Green Street.  The Club occasionally performed amateur plays for their own amusement and to raise funds for charities.

The story of Ali Baba and the Forty Thieves was a popular subject for pantomime. This entertainment was first produced at the Gaiety Theatre by its proprietor, John Hollingshead (also a member of the Club), as the Wednesday matinee on 13 February 1878. Robert Soutar (Nellie Farren's husband) acted as director/stage manager, with John D'Auban choreographing the Harlequinade that was played at the end of the pantomime. Meyer Lutz conducted the music.  Hollingshead secured the services of the professional female actors, the male amateur actors, the distinguished writers, Hollingshead later remembered, "[T]he gem of the performance was the grimly earnest and determined Harlequin of W. S. Gilbert.  It gave me an idea of what Oliver Cromwell would have made of the character."

Proceeds from the first performance of the piece were 700 pounds sterling, owing to a sell-out charity crowd paying enhanced prices. The Prince and Princess of Wales and many other dignitaries attended. Most of the proceeds were given to the Royal General Theatrical Fund and some to hospitals.

Roles and cast
The male cast members were amateur actors who were members of The Beefsteak Club.  The female cast members were professional actresses.

Ali Baba (a Woodcutter) – Captain Arthur Gooch
Ganem (his Son) – W. F. Quintin (Quintin Twiss)
Cassim (his Brother) – Algernon Bastard
Hassarac (Captain of the Forty Thieves) – Joseph Maclean (the only male non-member of the Beefsteak Club)
Abdallah (his Lieutenant) – Mr. Colnaghi (Helen Barry in trousers)
Mesrour – F. H. McCalmont
Gentlemen of "The Forty" (The Deserving Hanging Committee): (portrayed by:) William Yardley, Leslie Ward, Gilbert Farquhar, Hon. F. Parker, W. Higgins, Major Rolls, Archibald Stuart-Wortley, E. Darell, J. Westropp, J. Cumming, C. Ringrose, C. Daly, Hugh Drummond, J. Graham, Cecil Chapman, A. B. Cook, Benson, Amphlett and Hon. C. Vivian
Morgiana – Lydia Thompson
Cogia – Eleanor Bufton
The Good Fairy – Lucy Buckstone
Twenty young ladies from the Alhambra Theatre

Characters in The Harlequinade
Clown – William Gerald Elliot
Pantaloon – Thomas Knox Holmes
Columbine – Mdlle. Rosa
Harlequin – W. S. Gilbert
Swell – Lord De Clifford
Tailor – W. F. Quinton
Butterman – C. Ringrose
Baker – L. Ward
Sweep – W. Higgins
Waiter – J. Westropp
Ung Mossoo – Algernon Bastard
Policeman – Captain H. E. Colvile
Artist – Leslie Ward
Bricklayer – J. Graham
Butcher – C. Chapman
A Gent – A. B. Cook
Old Woman – F. H. McCalmont

Synopsis
Ali Baba
Scene 1. Written by Robert Reece – Exterior of Ali Baba's House
Scene 2. Written by W. S. Gilbert – The Wood
Scene 3. Written by F. C. Burnand – Interior of Ali Baba's House
Scene 4. Written by H. J. Byron – The Cave

The Transformation

The Harlequinade
Scene 1. A Quiet Street
Scene 2. An Equally Quiet Bedroom

Notes

References
Elliot, William Gerald. "The Amateur Pantomime of 1878", Amateur Clubs and Actors, Chapter VI, pp. 107–31 (1898) London: E. Arnold

Works by W. S. Gilbert
Works based on Ali Baba
1878 plays